Roger Aa Djupvik (born March 23, 1981) is a Norwegian cross-country skier who has competed since 2000. His best World Cup finish was a win in a 4 × 10 km relay event in Finland in March 2010.

Cross-country skiing results
All results are sourced from the International Ski Federation (FIS).

World Cup

Season standings

Team podiums

 1 victory – (1 ) 
 1 podium – (1 )

References

External links

1981 births
Living people
Norwegian male cross-country skiers
Place of birth missing (living people)